Maheen Zia is a Pakistani film director and film editor.

Education
She has a degree in Radio/TV Production from Drake University, Des Moines, Iowa, United States
and teaches at the Department of Visual Studies at the University of Karachi.

Career 
She has worked as an editor at a production house and made documentaries and 
short films on social issues and is one of the founder members and is on the 
organizing board of Pakistan's young, international film festival – The KaraFilm Festival (Karachi Film Festival).

She has served as Jury for International Film Festivals like Tehran International Short Film Festival 2005, Tehran, Iran, November 2005, Tampere Film Festival 2006, Tampere, Finland, March 2006,  and Hyderabad International Film Festival 2007, Hyderabad, AP, India. The berlinale lists her in their talent data base. She is also actively involved with PAWS Pakistan Animal Welfare Society

Maheen Zia, is the winner of India EU Film Initiative – 
Berlin Today Award 08 for the film 'Match Factor'
Maheen Zia worked as Juror for Afghanistan Competition of 2nd Kabul Documentary & Short 
Film Festival and also won the third prize of this festival for her documentary work 'The Women of Lahore' in the international competition section

Maheen Zia won the BERLIN TODAY AWARD 2008 for her short film Match Factor.

Filmography
Match Factor, 2008 short film [Writer, Director]
Candle In The Dark, 2006 – documentary (Director)
Gwadar – Between Golden Acres and the Deep Blue Sea, 2006 – documentary (Director)
A Pakistani Love Story – short film, 2006 (Director)
Aaj Bazar Mein (In Spirit & Flesh: The Women of Lahore's 'Diamond Market' (which is locally called in Pakistani Urdu language 'Heera Mandi') (Director)
Eclipse – Short Film, August 2005 [Director, Writer, Editor]
Building Bridges, 2005 – Documentary, (Director)
Doctor – short film, 2003 (co-director)
Multan: City of Living Crafts – documentary, 2003 (Writer, Editor, Director)
The People vs. Lyari Expressway – documentary, 2002 (Writer, Editor, Director)
Baba Snooker – short film, 2001 (Director)
Raat Chali Hai Jhoom Ke – feature film, 2000 (Editor)

References

External links 
 

Year of birth missing (living people)
Living people
Pakistani documentary film directors
Pakistani film directors
Pakistani film producers
Pakistani film editors
Academic staff of the University of Karachi
Pakistani women academics
Women film editors
Women documentary filmmakers